Manauri is a satellite township/neighborhood of Allahabad, Uttar Pradesh state of India. It is a market, 18 km west of Allahabad city headquarter. It lies on the border of Allahabad and Kaushambi district of Uttar Pradesh. On this town, a Railway Station lying nearby on the New Delhi - Howrah main line and an Air Force Station nearby on NH-2 is also named. Due to proximity of the Town with main Railway line and National highway, it has developed into a local trade market. The town has a huge population of more than 15 thousand, both of Hindus and Muslims. The main occupation is grains, vegetable and fruits agriculture along with traditional works like metal works, blacksmith, carpenter, glass works, and construction labours.

Transportation

Roadways
Manauri bajar is well connected to Allahabad and Kaushambi and other city by road. It situated in NH-2 (between Allahabad and kanpur) and SH-95 (Till Sarai Aqil, Kaushambi). It serve the large number of Auto rickshaw and Buses for Allahabad city and Kaushambi.

Railways
The Manauri railway station is on the Allahabad–Kanpur route. It is One of the major Railway stations for Kaushambi district

Allahabad Junction railway station is Nearest railway junction is well connected by Auto rickshaw and buses.

Airways
The Nearest Airport is Allahabad Airport is 8.0 km. It connect to major cities of India.

Manauri Airforce station lies in NH2, is a locality of Airforce.

Demographics 
of 2011 India census, Manauri had population of 15,265 of which 8,000+ are males while 7,500+ are females as per report released by Census India 2011.

Population of Children with age of 0-6 is 1500+ which is 10.01% of total population of Manauri. In Manauri Census, Female Sex Ratio is of 930 against state average of 912. Moreover Child Sex Ratio in Manauri Sult is around 901 compared to Uttar Pradesh state average of 902. Literacy rate of Manauri Sult city is 85.32% higher than state average of 67.68%. In Manauri, Male literacy is around 90.53% while female literacy rate is 79.75%.

Manauri Census has many villages Madpur, Mahmoodpur north, Nayaganj, Mahmoodpur south, Mahmoodpur east, Mahmoodpur west, Manauri Gav, Janka, Takiganj, sallahpur, bihka, Puramufti, koilaha, Dihva to which it supplies basic amenities like water and sewerage. It is also authorize to build roads within Census Town limits and impose taxes on properties coming under its jurisdiction.

Education 
There are Hindi Medium and English Medium Schools.

List of Colleges/Schools in Manauri:

 Kendriya Vidyalaya, Manauri
 Airforce school, Manauri
 Public Inter College
 Maharishi Dayanand Balika inter college
 Vidya science public school
 Puramufti Public School & College
 Baba sant surju prasad smarak vidya mandir
 Mother teresa convent
 Madhu vachaspati convent inter college
 MVIET
 Shaheed captan vijay pratap singh
 Ganga valley College
 Green valley school
 Gurukul Convent School

References

Cities and towns in Allahabad district